California's 20th district may refer to:

 California's 20th congressional district
 California's 20th State Assembly district
 California's 20th State Senate district